Kids' WB Fun Zone is a themed attraction in Warner Bros. Movie World on the Gold Coast, Queensland, Australia based on the Looney Tunes cartoons. The attraction was originally named Looney Tunes Village and was renamed in late 2007 when two new rides were added. At the same time, the Australian Kids' WB TV show began filming at the theme park.

Visitors can also meet and greet Bugs Bunny, Daffy Duck and the other Looney Tunes characters.

History
The attraction currently known as Kids' WB Fun Zone opened with Warner Bros. Movie World as Looney Tunes Land. At the time, the only attractions were the Looney Tunes Studio Tour (later Looney Tunes River Ride), Speedy Gonzales Tijuana Taxis, Looney Tunes Musical Revue and a playground. In December 1997, Warner Bros. Movie World renamed the area Looney Tunes Village and added several new rides including Marvin the Martian's Rocket Ride, Taz Hollywood Cars, Sylvester and Tweety Carousel (later Sylvester and Tweety Cages) and Yosemite Sam's Railroad. The addition of these rides forced the removal of the playground. On 26 December 2000, the Road Runner Rollercoaster opened on the former site of the Looney Tunes Musical Revue. The Looney Tunes Musical Revue was relocated to a portion of land near the adjacent Village Roadshow studio complex where part of Superman Escape now stands. In December 2001, Warner Bros. Movie World added the Looney Tunes Splash Zone.

In late 2007, the area was renamed Kids' WB Fun Zone to tie in with the filming of Australian TV show Kids' WB, at the park. At the same time, the Looney Tunes Carousel and Sylvester's Pounce 'n' Bounce opened. To avoid confusion between the Sylvester and Tweety Carousel and newly added Looney Tunes Carousel, it was also renamed, becoming "Sylvester and Tweety Cages". The removal of Marvin the Martian's Rocket Ride in 2010 was followed by the Looney Tunes River Ride the following year.

In 2013, Warner Bros. Movie World originally planned to open the Mini Cars Driving School. The ride would have allowed children to drive their own cars around a miniature version of the theme park. The ride would have been located in the Kids' WB Fun Zone where the Looney Tunes River Ride once stood. The plans to build the ride were reportedly put on hold due to Village Roadshow reallocating the investment towards an expansion of Sea World's Polar Bear Shores.

Timeline

Former attractions
 Looney Tunes Musical Revue was a live show featuring Looney Tunes characters. The show began in 1991 and was relocated in 2000 to a location where Superman Escape currently stands. When Superman Escape was constructed in 2005 the show was relocated again before ending and being replaced with Looney Tunes – What's Up Rock?.
 Looney Tunes River Ride was an indoor boat ride where guests would be taken on a journey to help find Bugs Bunny. The ride opened with the park in 1991 and closed in 2011 to make way for a new attraction.

 Looney Tunes – What’s Up Rock? was a live show featuring Looney Tunes characters including Bugs Bunny, Daffy Duck, Lola Bunny, Tweety, Sylvester, Wile E. Coyote and Taz. The show ran in The Movie World Show Stage. After 2012 the show has never been performed.

 Marvin the Martian's Rocket Ride was a Zamperla Crazy Bus themed to a rocket ship. Theming around the ride related to Duck Dodgers (Daffy Duck) as seen in one of the cartoons. The ride was plagued with a variety of maintenance issues and was removed in 2010.

 Sylvester's Pounce 'n' Bounce, along with the Looney Tunes Carousel, opened in 2007 when the zone changed its name to the Kids' WB Fun Zone. Prior to the ride being built, several giant carrots were located here. This ride is a SBF Visa Happy Tower in a shape of a tree. A Sylvester character is mounted on the carriage and is trying to catch Tweety who is at the top of the tree. The ride was removed in 2020.

 Taz Hollywood Cars was a set of Zamperla Mini Bumper Cars. These are something fun for the younger children, They are smaller and slower ensuring the safety and enjoyment of our youngest generation.

 An unknown playground opened with the park in 1991 and closed when the area was renamed to Looney Tunes Village in 1997.

Attractions

Looney Tunes Carousel
This ride, along with the Sylvester's Pounce 'n' Bounce, opened in 2007 when the zone changed its name to the Kids' WB Fun Zone. Prior to the ride being built, a merchandise shop was located here. This ride is a carousel with several Looney Tunes characters which guests can ride on.

Looney Tunes Splash Zone
"Children can have the best fun getting wet and cooling down at Looney Tunes Splash Zone, a permanent attraction located in the ever-popular Looney Tunes Village at Warner Bros. Movie World." This attraction opened in 2001.

Road Runner Rollercoaster

The Road Runner Rollercoaster is a Vekoma Sitdown Junior Coaster which opened on 26 December 2000. The 335m ride features an incline of 11 metres and reaches a top speed of  / hour. The coaster's two trains are both made up of eight cars. The ride has a minimum height requirement of 100 cm.

Speedy Gonzales Tijuana Taxis
One of the parks original rides, The Speedy Gonzales Tijuana Taxis are a fun one for little ones. It has a track just wide enough to let one car at a time through, forcing them in the one direction. They are small slower 'Go Karts' for the little kids!

Sylvester and Tweety Cages
Originally called Sylvester and Tweety Carousel, this ride is a flat ride where riders are rotated and periodically raised and lowered. The ride changed its name in 2007 when the Kids' WB Fun Zone had an actual carousel built. The song Thumbelina by Raffi used to play at the ride in the 2000s.

Yosemite Sam's Railroad

Yosemite Sam's Railroad is a Zamperla Kiddie Train. Riders board the train and complete two circuits of the track. Originally the ride featured a set of crossroads to enable the train to do a figure of 8. This was removed and replaced with a series of corners.

See also
 Beach Break Bay

References

External links
 

Looney Tunes
Warner Bros. Movie World
Amusement rides introduced in 1991
Amusement rides that closed in 1997
Amusement rides introduced in 1997
Amusement rides that closed in 2007
Amusement rides introduced in 2007
1991 establishments in Australia
Themed areas in Warner Bros. Parks and Resorts